Dentin matrix acidic phosphoprotein 1 is a protein that in humans is encoded by the DMP1 gene.

Dentin matrix acidic phosphoprotein is an extracellular matrix protein and a member of the small integrin-binding ligand N-linked glycoprotein (SIBLING) family (other members being DSPP, IBSP, MEPE, and SPP1). This protein, which is critical for proper mineralization of bone and dentin, is present in diverse cells of bone and tooth tissues. The protein contains a large number of acidic domains, multiple phosphorylation sites, a functional arg-gly-asp cell attachment sequence, and a DNA binding domain. In undifferentiated osteoblasts it is primarily a nuclear protein that regulates the expression of osteoblast-specific genes. During osteoblast maturation the protein becomes phosphorylated and is exported to the extracellular matrix, where it orchestrates mineralized matrix formation. Mutations in the gene are known to cause autosomal recessive hypophosphatemia, a disease that manifests as rickets and osteomalacia. The gene structure is conserved in mammals. Two transcript variants encoding different isoforms have been described for this gene.

References
Cell Cycle-Dependent Nuclear Localization of DMP1

J.O. MANCERA1, T. JHALA2, S. WANG2, C. QIN2, R. D'SOUZA2, and Y. LU2, 1School of Dentistry, Meharry Medical College, Nashville, TN, 2Department of Biomedical Sciences, Texas A&M Health Science Center, Baylor College of Dentistry, Dallas, TX

Further reading

Extracellular matrix proteins